Farid Bouzidi (born April 11, 1990 in Boumerdès) is an Algerian football player who plays for RC Kouba in the Algerian Ligue Professionnelle 2.

Club career
On May 28, 2011, Bouzidi made his professional debut for MC Alger in a league match against USM Annaba.

References

External links
 
 

1990 births
Algerian footballers
Algerian Ligue Professionnelle 1 players
Living people
MC Alger players
RC Kouba players
Association football goalkeepers
21st-century Algerian people